The Japan national football team in 2010, managed by head coach Takeshi Okada, began by competing in the 2011 AFC Asian Cup qualification and the 2010 East Asian Football Championship in amongst other international friendly matches in the build-up to the 2010 FIFA World Cup finals where they would finish in 9th place. Afterwards the team, managed first by interim head coach Hiromi Hara and finally head coach Alberto Zaccheroni, would close out 2010 with several more international friendly matches as they prepared for the 2011 Asian Cup and the 2011 Copa América in the following year.

Record

Kits

Schedule
2011 AFC Asian Cup qualification

International Friendly (2010 Kirin Challenge Cup)

2010 East Asian Football Championship

2010 East Asian Football Championship

2010 East Asian Football Championship

2011 AFC Asian Cup qualification

International Friendly (2010 Kirin Challenge Cup)

International Friendly (2010 Kirin Challenge Cup)

International Friendly

International Friendly

2010 FIFA World Cup Group E

2010 FIFA World Cup Group E

2010 FIFA World Cup Group E

2010 FIFA World Cup Round of 16

International Friendly (2010 Kirin Challenge Cup)

International Friendly (2010 Kirin Challenge Cup)

International Friendly (2010 Kirin Challenge Cup)

International Friendly

Players statistics

Goalscorers

References

External links
Japan Football Association

Japan national football team results
2010 in Japanese football
Japan